Creedia is a genus of sandburrowers native to the Indian and western Pacific oceans.

Species
There are currently four recognized species in this genus:
 Creedia alleni J. S. Nelson, 1983
 Creedia bilineata Shimada & Yoshino, 1987
 Creedia haswelli (E. P. Ramsay, 1881) (Slender sand-diver)
 Creedia partimsquamigera J. S. Nelson, 1983 (Half-scaled sand-diver)

References

Creediidae
Marine fish genera
Taxa named by James Douglas Ogilby